Sepúlveda is a municipality located in the province of Segovia, Castile and León, Spain. The town lies next to the Hoces del Rio Duratón National Park and also incorporates the district of Duratón.

The town of Sepúlveda is first mentioned in the Chronicle of Alfonso III. They referred to their depopulation as a result of the raids of Alfonso I. In the year 940 is charged to Fernán González of Castile, which stabilizes restocking a Christian area beyond the Duero River. There is a legend which tells the struggle of Fernan Gonzalez and Mayor Abubad Muslim. This legend is reflected on the facade of the "Casa del Moro". Fernan González gave Sepulveda a charter to assist in their recruitment.

In 1111, Sepulveda lands came the Battle of Candespina, in which Alfonso I of Aragon and Count Henry of Portugal fought and defeated Urraca of León and Castile. This victory resulted in the independence of Portugal.

During the Peninsular War, Sepúlveda witnessed the only battle in which Napoleon's Imperial Guard fought. This action is settled with a failure for the French that fail to destroy the Spanish forces, first withdraw to Sepúlveda and then, undisturbed, for Segovia. The action was a delay to the Napoleon's advance towards Madrid before the Battle of Somosierra. Sepúlveda was besieged by French troops on its territory and Juan Martín Díez (which was based in the caves of Duratón River Canyon) acted.

A popular town within the province of Segovia to visit for cultural and gastronomic pursuits, a number of traditional restaurants serve roasted cordero and cochinillo.

References

External links 

Municipalities in the Province of Segovia